Kazimierz Serocki (3 March 1922 – 9 January 1981) was a Polish composer and one of the founders of the Warsaw Autumn contemporary music festival.

Life
Serocki was born in Toruń.  He studied composition with Kazimierz Sikorski and piano with Stanisław Szpinalski at the State Higher School of Music in Łódź and graduated in 1946.  He continued in Paris, studying composition with Nadia Boulanger and piano with Lazare Lévy, before graduating in 1947-1948.  Between 1946 and 1951 he performed many times as a concert pianist in Poland and abroad, but for the rest of his career, he was focused exclusively on composition.  Serocki's output is concentrated in two main spheres: orchestral music and vocal-instrumental pieces to Polish texts selected with fine discrimination. His main compositional idea was to explore sound color in music. His last work – Pianophonie (1979) – used the possibilities provided by electronic processing of live piano sound.

Serocki was one of the founders, along with Tadeusz Baird, of the Warsaw Autumn international contemporary music festival (1956). Together with Tadeusz Baird and Jan Krenz he formed the composers' group Group 49. He was vice-president of the central administration of the Polish Composers' Union from 1954 to 1955. He received a number of Polish and foreign awards, including several State Prizes, among them one in 1952 for his music to the film Young Chopin. He also received a prize at the UNESCO competition in 1959, for the Sinfonietta and the award of the Minister of Culture and Fine Arts in 1963 for the whole of his work.  He died, aged 58, in Warsaw.

Works

Chamber music
Suite  for 4 trombones - 1953
Sonatina for trombone and piano - 1954
Dance for clarinet and piano - 1954
Improvisationen für Blockflöten-Quartett - 1959
Continuum - sextet for percussion instruments - 1966
Swinging Music for clarinet, trombone, cello or double bass, and piano - 1970
Fantasmagoria for piano and percussion - 1971
Arrangements for 1-4 recorders - 1975-1976

Orchestral works and concertos
Three Melodies from Kurpie  for 6 sopranos, 6 tenors, and chamber orchestra - 1949
Romantic Concerto for piano and orchestra - 1950
Symphony No. 1 - 1952
Symphony No. 2, "Symphony of Song" for soprano, baritone, choir, and orchestra - 1953
Concerto for trombone and orchestra - 1953
Sinfonietta for 2 string orchestras - 1956
Heart of the Night, song cycle for baritone and orchestra - 1956
Eyes of the Air, song cycle for soprano and orchestra - 1957
Musica concertante - 1958
Episodes for strings and 3 groups of percussion - 1959
Segmenti - 1961
Symphonic Frescoes - 1964
Niobe, music to extracts from a poem by Konstanty Ildefons Gałczyński for 2 reciters (man and woman), mixed choir, and orchestra - 1966
Forte e piano, music for two pianos and orchestra - 1967
Poems, to words by Tadeusz Różewicz for soprano and chamber orchestra - 1969
Dramatic Story for orchestra - 1971
Fantasia elegiaca for organ and orchestra - 1972
Impromptu fantasque for recorders, mandolins, guitars, percussion and piano - 1973
Sonatina for trombone and orchestra - 1974 (arrangement of the 1954 Sonatina)
Concerto alla cadenza per flauto a becco e orchestra - 1974
Ad libitum five pieces for symphony orchestra - 1973-1977
Pianophonie for piano, electronic transformation of sound and orchestra - 1976-1978

Solo instruments
Suite of Preludes for piano - 1952
Brownies (Krasnoludki), 7 miniatures for children for piano - 1953
Sonata for piano - 1955
A piacere, suggestions for piano - 1963

Voice and piano
Heart of the Night (Serce nocy), song cycle for baritone and piano (text: K.I. Gałczyński) - 1956
Eyes of the Air (Oczy powietrza), song cycle for soprano and piano (text: J. Przyboś) - 1957

4-part unaccompanied mixed choir
Songs of Midsummer Night, suite, folk text - 1954
Suite, from the Opole Region in Silesia, folk text - 1954

See also
Polish School (music)

References

External links
 PMC
 Kazimierz Serocki at PWM Edition
 Music in Movement Website
 Kazimierz Serocki Official Website
 

1922 births
1981 deaths
20th-century classical composers
20th-century male musicians
People from Toruń
Polish classical composers
Polish male classical composers
Recipients of the State Award Badge (Poland)